The Texas Medal of Merit, formerly known as the Texas Meritorious Service Medal, is the seventh highest military decoration that can be conferred to a service member of the Texas Military Forces. Subsequent decorations are denoted by a bronze or silver acorn device. A "V" device is conferred for an act or acts of courage.

Eligibility
The Texas Medal of Merit is conferred to any service member of the Texas Military Forces who distinguished themselves by outstanding service, extraordinary achievement, or act(s) of courage on behalf of the State of Texas or the United States.

 Meritorious achievement or meritorious service includes that service rendered specifically on behalf of the Texas Military Forces, and/or to the United States Armed Forces. It also includes acts of courage which do not meet the requirements for confer of a higher decoration.
 Superior performance of normal duties does not, in itself, constitute automatic justification for decoration of the Texas Medal of Merit. Decorations will be restricted to the recognition of achievements and services that are clearly outstanding and unmistakably exceptional when compared to similar achievements of personnel of like rank and responsibilities. This service or achievement, although clearly outstanding, is of a lesser degree than that service or achievement required for a higher decoration. Successful accomplishment of a pre-designated number of tasks or functions is not a valid basis for an automatic decoration. However, unusual and extraordinary sustained performance may be used as a point of departure in justifying meritorious achievement or service.
 In instances where many service members are affiliated with an exceptionally meritorious program, project, or mission, the Texas Medal of Merit will be conferred only to those relatively few service members whose contributions clearly stand out from the others and who have contributed most to the success of the program.
 The Texas Medal of Merit is conferred for act(s) of courage which involve personal hazard or danger and the voluntary risk of life but which, although sufficient to clearly set themselves apart from other service members in similar circumstances, is of a lesser degree than required for the Lone Star Medal of Valor. When conferred for act(s) of courage, a bronze block letter “V” will be included.

Authority 
The Texas Medal of Merit was originally authorized as the Meritorious Service Medal by the Forty-first Texas Legislature in House Concurrent Resolution Number 8 during the fifth called session 19 February 20-March 1930. It was approved by Governor Dan Moody on 20 March 1930. 

It was re-authorized as the Texas Medal of Merit by the Fifty-eighth Texas Legislature in Senate Bill Number 279 and approved by Governor John Connally on 3 May 1963, effective 23 August 1963.

Description

Medal 
The medal pendant is of bronze, 1-1/4 inches in diameter. On the obverse side is a five-pointed star, one point up, 3/4 of an inch in diameter; superimposed on the star is a Roman two-handed sword, point down, with crossed branches of olive and live oak; in the reentrant angles, there are three raised rays (3/16 of an inch). The star is encircled by the words "MERITORIOUS SERVICE" along the upper arc, "TEXAS NATIONAL GUARD" along the upper arc, and "FOR SERVICE" along the lower arc, in raised letters. The medal pendant is suspended by a ring from a moiré silk ribbon, 1-3/8 inches long and 1-3/8 inches wide, composed of stripes of red (1/8 of an inch), blue (1/4 of an inch), red (1/8 of an inch), yellow (3/8 of an inch), red (1/8 of an inch), blue (1/4 of an inch) and red (1/8 of an inch).

Devices

Subsequent decorations 
A bronze acorn, ¼ of an inch in length, is conferred for second and succeeding decorations. A silver acorn is worn in lieu of five bronze acorns. Silver acorns are worn to the wearer's right of a bronze acorn. "Acorns will be worn centered on the suspension ribbon and service ribbon with acorn upright (crown on top). If four acorns are worn on the suspension ribbon (on either the full size or miniature medal), the fourth one will be placed above the middle one in the row of three. Up to four acorns will be worn side-by-side on the service ribbon".

Act(s) of courage 
The “V” device is a bronze block letter “V”. It is conferred for an act or acts of courage. The “V” device is worn centered on the suspension ribbon and service ribbon. Not more than one “V” device will be worn on a ribbon. When worn with an acorn or acorns, the “V” device will be worn on the wearer's right.

Notable Recipients

See also 

 Awards and decorations of the Texas Military
 Awards and decorations of the Texas government

 Texas Military Forces
 Texas Military Department
 List of conflicts involving the Texas Military

External links
Texas Medal of Merit

References

Texas
Texas Military Forces
Texas Military Department